The industrial parks in Karachi have been built in Karachi, Sindh, Pakistan. The industrial parks manufacture consumer and industrial goods, creating jobs for the local population.

An industrial park (also known as industrial estate, trading estate) is an area zoned and planned for the purpose of industrial development. An industrial park can be thought of as a more "heavyweight" version of a business park or office park, which has offices and light industry, rather than heavy industry. Industrial parks are usually located on the edges of, or outside of, the main residential area of a city, and are normally provided with good transportation access, including road and rail.

The National Industrial Parks Development and Management Company (NIP) and Sci Life Pharma signed a licence agreement that authorises the latter to start the construction of a manufacturing plant – considered to be its flagship project – in the Korangi Creek Industrial Park (KCIP).

Industrial parks in Karachi
 Bin Qasim Industrial Zone
 Federal B Industrial Area
 Karachi Export Processing Zone
 Korangi Creek Industrial Park
 Korangi Industrial Area
 North Karachi Industrial Area
 Pakistan Textile City
 S.I.T.E Industrial Area
 West Wharf Industrial Area

References

External links
 National Industrial Parks Development and Management
  Pakistan Industrial Development Corporation